Individualized Apparel Group is a holding company that owns Oxxford Clothes, Holland & Sherry, Gitman Bros, H. Freeman, Corbin, Coppley, Individualized Shirts, and Measure Up Custom Shirts. Joe Blair is its president. Spencer Hays founded the company originally as Tom James Company in 1966, which still sells men’s suits via appointments in offices or homes. Individualized Apparel Group began in 1973 with the acquisition of the Individualized Shirt factory in Perth Amboy, New Jersey. Individualized Apparel Group has owned Gitman Bros. for over 20 years.

References

Clothing retailers of the United States